Nyah West is a town in Victoria (Australia) near the Murray River, the border with New South Wales.

The town was established when the railway line was extended from Swan Hill to Piangil in 1915 passing some distance to the west of the established township of Nyah. A full Post Office opened here on 1 December 1917. Nyah West Magistrates' Court was formally closed on 1 September 1982, having used a local hall rather than its own courthouse and not having sat for many years.

It is the business and commercial centre of a prosperous irrigation district which produces wine and dried fruit, as well as vegetables and wool.

The town in conjunction with neighbouring township Nyah has an Australian Rules football team competing in the Central Murray Football League known as Nyah-Nyah West United.

Golfers play at the course of the Nyah West Golf Club on Yarraby Road.

Gallery

References

External links

Towns in Victoria (Australia)
Rural City of Swan Hill